Constructs of the State is the third album by American crust punk band Leftöver Crack, released in 2015 on the Fat Wreck Chords label. It features guest appearances from Jesse Michaels, Joe Jack Talcum and Penny Rimbaud as well as members of Bouncing Souls, All Torn Up, Mischief Brew, Riverboat Gamblers, Blackbird Raum, Days N Daze, Conquest for Death, REIVERS, and Intro5pect.

Track listing

References

External links 
 
 

2015 albums
Leftöver Crack albums
Fat Wreck Chords albums